Zille and Me is a 1983 East German musical film directed by Werner W. Wallroth. It was entered into the 13th Moscow International Film Festival.

Cast
 Kurt Nolze as Heinrich Zille
 Daniela Hoffmann as Henriette "Jette" Kramer
 Thomas Zieler as Ede Schmidt
 Doris Abeßer as Luise Kramer
 Erik S. Klein as F.W. König
 Helmut Schreiber as Diestelmeyer Sen.
 Hans-Otto Reintsch as Hugo Diestelmeyer
 Marianne Wünscher as Wanda Senfmilch
 Angela Brunner as Olga
 Eckhard Müller as Pluto
 Uwe Zerbe as Karwinkel

References

External links
 

1983 films
1980s musical films
1980s biographical films
German musical films
German biographical films
East German films
1980s German-language films
Films directed by Werner W. Wallroth
Films set in Berlin
Biographical films about artists
Films set in the 1900s
1980s German films